Evan Lloyd Vaughan  (c. 1709–1791) was a Welsh politician who sat in the House of Commons from 1774 to 1791.

 
Vaughan was the son of Richard Vaughan MP and his wife Margaret Lloyd, daughter of Sir Evan Lloyd of Bodidris, Denbighshire. He was educated at Eton College from  1725 to 1727 and was admitted at St John's College, Cambridge in 1728. He was Constable of Harlech Castle from July 1754 and High Sheriff of Denbighshire in 1766–7. He succeeded his brother to Corsygedol in 1775.

Vaughan was unwilling to stand at Merioneth in  the 1768 general election  when his brother William Vaughan declined re-election. J. Pugh Pryse was returned instead and when Pryse's died in January 1774, Vaughan was still reluctant to stand. However he was returned unopposed as Member of Parliament for Merioneth  in the by-election on 24 February 1774. At the 1774 general election soon after he had to fight a contested election, which showed the strength of the Vaughan interest. All his subsequent elections  in 1780, 1784 and 1790 were uncontested. There is no record of his having spoken in the House before 1790. Contemporary parliamentary historian Thomas Oldfield described him in 1816 as “one of the last independent members of the old constitutional school”.

Vaughan died unmarried on 4 December 1791.

References

1700s births
1791 deaths
People educated at Eton College
Alumni of St John's College, Cambridge
British MPs 1768–1774
British MPs 1774–1780
British MPs 1780–1784
British MPs 1784–1790
British MPs 1790–1796
Members of the Parliament of Great Britain for Welsh constituencies
High Sheriffs of Denbighshire